Ashcott railway station was a station on the Highbridge branch of the Somerset and Dorset Joint Railway. Opened by the Somerset Central Railway in 1856 as Ashcott and Meare, the name changed to Ashcott in 1876. Consisting of a short wooden platform and station building, the station was next to a road level crossing. This was operated with a 10 lever ground frame.

History
The station was opened by the Somerset and Dorset Joint Railway, a joint line run by a committee for the Midland Railway and the Southern Railway. The line became a joint operation of the Southern Railway and the London, Midland and Scottish Railway after the grouping of 1923. It was placed in the Western Region when the railways were nationalised in 1948. The station closed when trains were withdrawn during the Beeching Axe, taking effect on 7 March 1966.

Eclipse Peat Company

 west of Ashcott existed Alexander Siding, which allowed exchange between the SD&JR and the Eclipse Peat Works  industrial tramway system, and hence distribution of cut peat products across the United Kingdom. The Eclipse also had a level crossing on the SD&JR branch further towards Glastonbury.

On 19 August 1949, a British Railways passenger train from Highbridge collided with an Eclipse narrow gauge diesel locomotive crossing on the level and left the track, ending up in the Glastonbury Canal.

Further reading 

 
https://web.archive.org/web/20120207022852/http://www.sdjr.net/locations/ashcott.html
 Station on navigable O.S. map

References 

Disused railway stations in Somerset
Former Somerset and Dorset Joint Railway stations
Railway stations in Great Britain opened in 1856
Railway stations in Great Britain closed in 1966
Beeching closures in England